John Edward Bromwich (14 November 1918 – 21 October 1999) was an Australian tennis player who, along with fellow countryman Vivian McGrath, was one of the first great players to use a two-handed backhand. He was a natural left-hander, though hit his serve with his right hand. Bromwich twice won the Australian Championships singles title, in 1939 (over Adrian Quist in a straight sets final) and in 1946 (a thrilling 5-set final victory over Dinny Pails). He was ranked World No. 3 by A. Wallis Myers in 1938 and again by Harry Hopman in 1947.

Tennis career
Although a fine singles player, Bromwich was primarily known as being a brilliant doubles player, winning 13 men's doubles titles and 4 mixed doubles titles in the majors. Tennis great (and near contemporary) Jack Kramer writes in his 1979 autobiography that if "Earth were playing in the all-time Universe Davis Cup, I'd play Budge and Vines in my singles, and Budge and Bromwich in the doubles. That's what I think of Johnny as a doubles player."

In the 1939 Davis Cup final, just as World War II was starting, Bromwich played arguably the match of his life in beating the American, Frank Parker, in straight sets, to clinch the Cup for Australia. Australia had trailed 0–2 after the first day, and came back to win the tie, 3–2. This remains the only time in Davis Cup history where the winning team has won a Davis Cup final after trailing 0–2.

In 1948, Bromwich played the American Bob Falkenburg in the Wimbledon final, and had a championship point at 5–3 in the fifth set. He came to the net for a volley but decided that Falkenburg's ball would go long and let it go by. It landed on the baseline and Falkenburg fought his way back into the match. Bromwich later had another two championship points, but was unable to take those either, and Falkenburg came back to win the championship, taking the last four games to win the fifth set, 7–5. Kramer later wrote that "...it never seemed to me that he was the same player after that. He doubted himself. He was a precision player to start with – he used a terribly light racket weighing less than twelve ounces, and it was strung loosely. He could put a ball on a dime, and I suppose after he misjudged that one shot, the most important in his life, he never possessed the confidence he needed." Bromwich also had a championship point in losing the 1947 Australian Championships singles final to Dinny Pails.

Bromwich gained some revenge against Falkenburg in the 1949 Wimbledon quarterfinals, coming back from two sets down to win in five sets. Bromwich then lost to Jaroslav Drobný in the semifinals.

Writing about Bromwich, Kramer says, "Bromwich was like McMillan today because as a kid John hit from both sides two-handed, and while he eventually had given up the two-handed forehand, he still hit backhand two-handed and could anything back from the baseline. He had strokes very much like Connors."

Bromwich was inducted into the International Tennis Hall of Fame in Newport, Rhode Island in 1984. He received a posthumous Davis Cup commitment award in 2017 which was presented to his wife by the ITF and Tennis Australia.

Grand Slam finals

Singles (2 wins, 6 losses)

Doubles: (13 wins, 3 losses)

Mixed Doubles: 11 (4 wins, 7 losses)

References

Sources
 The Game – My 40 Years in Tennis (1979) — Jack Kramer with Frank Deford

External links 
 
 
 
 
 

1918 births
1999 deaths
Australian Championships (tennis) champions
Australian Championships (tennis) junior champions
Australian male tennis players
International Tennis Hall of Fame inductees
Tennis players from Sydney
United States National champions (tennis)
Wimbledon champions (pre-Open Era)
Grand Slam (tennis) champions in men's singles
Grand Slam (tennis) champions in mixed doubles
Grand Slam (tennis) champions in men's doubles
Grand Slam (tennis) champions in boys' singles
Grand Slam (tennis) champions in boys' doubles
Sport Australia Hall of Fame inductees
20th-century Australian people